Oklahoma City tornado may refer to:

1998 Oklahoma City tornadoes
1999 Bridge Creek–Newcastle–Oklahoma City–Moore tornado
2003 Oklahoma City area tornado
2003 North Oklahoma City tornado
2013 South Oklahoma City–Moore tornado